Puchades is a surname. Notable people with the surname include:

Antonio Puchades (1925–2013), Spanish footballer
Luis Planas Puchades (born 1952), Spanish labour inspector, diplomat, and politician

 Spanish-language surnames